Ascidae is a family of mites in the order Mesostigmata.

Description 
Ascidae are mites characterised by: seta st4 usually on unsclerotised cuticle, peritrematic shield broadly connected to exopodal shield beside coxa IV, fixed cheliceral digit with setiform pilus dentilis and movable cheliceral digit usually with two teeth, sternal shield with three pairs of lyrifissures and the third pair usually on the shield's posterior margin, genital shield truncate to convex posteriorly (tapering in some Antennoseius), with an anal shield bearing only circumanal setae (rare) or a ventrianal shield bearing additionally up to seven pairs of setae, and spermathecal apparatus laelapid-type.

This family is morphologically similar to Blattisociidae and Melicharidae, and these families were formerly included within Ascidae.

Life cycle 
The life cycle of Ascidae consists of the stages egg, larva, protonymph, deutonymph and adult. Each stage has a duration measurable in days. The total lifespan is similarly short, being on average 27 days in Arctoseius semiscissus and 19 days in Proctolaelaps deleoni.

Ecology 
Ascidae include epedaphic species that hunt on the soil surface in the litter layer. These prey on other small arthropods, particularly springtails (Collembola). Nematophagy (consumption of nematodes) is also prevalent in soil-dwelling Ascidae.

Other habitats from which Ascidae have been collected include under bark of dead trees, on small mammals, and in nests of birds and mammals.

Though mostly terrestrial, some ascids live on wet plants and detritus and on the water surface of marginal freshwater habitats. These walk about on the surface film and feed on the floating egg masses of nematocerous flies such as mosquitoes.

Ascidae can disperse to new environments via phoresis: riding on larger arthropods. Species of Arctoseius are phoretic on adults of mushroom sciarid fly, Lycoriella auripila (whose eggs and larvae they consume), while aquatic ascids are phoretic on adult crane flies.

Zoogeography 
Ascidae occur in many countries and regions. The highest numbers of species, endemic species and genera occur in the Palearctic. On the other hand, the most speciose genus, Asca, has the most species in the Neotropical and Oriental regions. Ascidae is believed to have originated from the Palearctic.

Genera
 Aceoseius Sellnick, 1941     
 Adhaerenseius G. C. Loots & P. D. Theron, 1992     
 Africoseius Krantz, 1962     
 Anephiasca Athias-Henriot, 1969     
 Antennoseius Berlese, 1916     
 Anystipalpus Berlese, 1911     
 Arctopsis Athias-Henriot, 1973     
 Arctoseius Thor, 1930     
 Arrhenoseius Walter & Lindquist, 2001     
 Asca von Heyden, 1826     
 Blattisocius Keegan, 1944     
 Cheiroseiulus G. O. Evans & A. S. Baker, 1991     
 Cheiroseius Berlese, 1916     
 Diseius Lindquist & Evans, 1965     
 Ectoantennoseius Walter, 1998     
 Gamasellodes Athias-Henriot, 1961     
 Hoploseius Berlese, 1914     
 Iphidozercon Berlese, 1903     
 Laelaptoseius Womersley, 1960     
 Lasioseius Berlese, 1916     
 Leioseius Berlese, 1916     
 Melichares Hering, 1838     
 Mycolaelaps Lindquist, 1995     
 Neojordensia Evans, 1957     
 Orolaelaps de Leon, 1963     
 Orthadenella Athias-Henriot, 1973     
 Paraproctolaelaps Bregetova, 1977     
 Platyseius Berlese, 1916     
 Plesiosejus Evans, 1960     
 Proctogastrolaelaps McGraw & Farrier, 1969     
 Proctolaelaps Berlese, 1923     
 Protogamasellus Karg, 1962     
 Rettenmeyerius Elzinga, 1998     
 Rhinoseius Baker & Yunker, 1964     
 Tropicoseius Baker & Yunker, 1964     
 Xanthippe Naskrecki & Colwell, 1995     
 Xenoseius Lindquist & Evans, 1965     
 Zerconopsis Hull, 1918     
 Zercoseius Berlese, 1916

References

Mesostigmata
 
Acari families

kk:Асцидиялар